

The tortrix moth, genus Pammene, belongs to the tribe Grapholitini of the subfamily Olethreutinae.

Species
89 species are currently recognized in Pammene:

 Pammene aceris Kuznetzov in Danilevsky & Kuznetsov, 1968
 Pammene adusta Kuznetzov 1972
 Pammene agnotana Rebel, 1914
 Pammene ainorum Kuznetzov in Danilevsky & Kuznetsov, 1968
 Pammene albuginana (Guenée, 1845)
 Pammene amygdalana (Duponchel in Godart, 1842)
 Pammene argyrana (Hübner, [1799])
 Pammene aurana (Fabricius, 1775)
 Pammene aurita Razowski, 1992
 Pammene avetianae Kuznetzov, 1964
 Pammene bathysema Diakonoff, 1976
 Pammene blanda Bae & Park, 1998
 Pammene blockiana (Herrich-Schäffer, 1851)
 Pammene bowmanana (McDunnough, 1927)
 Pammene caeruleata Kuznetzov, 1970
 Pammene caliginosa Kuznetzov, 1972
 Pammene christophana (Moschler, 1862)
 Pammene clanculana (Tengström, 1869)
 Pammene cocciferana Walsingham, 1903
 Pammene crataegicola Liu & Komai, 1993
 Pammene crataegophila Amsel, 1935
 Pammene cyanatra (Diakonoff, 1976)
 Pammene cytisana (Zeller, 1847)
 Pammene engadinensis Müller-Rutz, 1920
 Pammene epanthista (Meyrick, 1922)
 Pammene exscribana Kuznetzov, 1986
 Pammene fasciana  (Linnaeus, 1761) – chestnut leafroller
 Pammene felicitana Heinrich, 1923
 Pammene festiva Kuznetzov, 1972
 Pammene flavicellula Kuznetzov, 1971
 Pammene fulminea (Komai, 1999)
 Pammene gallicana (Guenée, 1845)
 Pammene gallicolana (Lienig & Zeller, 1846)
 Pammene germmana (Hübner, [1799])
 Pammene giganteana (Peyerimhoff, 1863)
 Pammene ginkgoicola Liu, 1992
 Pammene griseana Walsingham, 1900
 Pammene griseomaculana Kuznetzov, 1960
 Pammene grunini (Kuznetzov, 1960)
 Pammene ignorata Kuznetzov, in Danilevsky & Kuznetsov, 1968
 Pammene insolentana Kuznetzov, 1964
 Pammene instructana Kuznetzov, 1964
 Pammene insulana (Guenée, 1845)
 Pammene japonica Kuznetzov in Danilevsky & Kuznetsov, 1968
 Pammene juniperana (Millière, 1858)
 Pammene laserpitiana Huemer & Erlebach, 1999
 Pammene leucitis (Meyrick, 1907)
 Pammene luculentana Kuznetzov in Danilevsky, Kuznetsov & Falkovitsh, 1962
 Pammene luedersiana (Sorhagen, 1885)
 Pammene macrolepis Diakonoff, 1976
 Pammene mariana (Zerny, 1920)
 Pammene medioalbana Knudson, 1986
 Pammene megalocephala Diakonoff, 1983
 Pammene monotincta Kuznetzov, 1976
 Pammene nannodes Walsingham, 1900
 Pammene nemorosa Kuznetzov in Danilevsky & Kuznetsov, 1968
 Pammene nequior Kuznetzov, 1964
 Pammene nescia Kuznetzov, 1972
 Pammene nigritana (Mann, 1862)
 Pammene obscurana (Stephens, 1834)
 Pammene ochsenheimeriana (Lienig & Zeller, 1846)
 Pammene ocliferia (Heinrich, 1926)
 Pammene oreina Kuznetzov, 1973
 Pammene orientana Kuznetzov, 1960
 Pammene ornata Walsingham, 1903
 Pammene oxycedrana (Millière, 1876)
 Pammene paula (Heinrich, 1926)
 Pammene percognata Diakonoff, 1976
 Pammene perstructana (Walker, 1863)
 Pammene phthoneris Diakonoff, 1976
 Pammene piceae Komai, 1999
 Pammene populana (Fabricius, 1787)
 Pammene pulchella Amsel, 1935
 Pammene pullana Kuznetzov, 1986
 Pammene purpureana (Constant, 1888)
 Pammene querceti (Gozmány, 1957)
 Pammene regiana (Zeller, 1849)
 Pammene rhediella (Clerck, 1759)
 Pammene salvana (Staudinger, 1859)
 Pammene shicotanica Kuznetzov in Danilevsky & Kuznetsov, 1968
 Pammene soyoensis Bae & Park, 1998
 Pammene spiniana (Duponchel in Godart, 1842)
 Pammene splendidulana (Guenée, 1845)
 Pammene subsalvana Kuznetzov, 1960
 Pammene suspectana (Lienig & Zeller, 1846)
 Pammene tauriana Kuznetzov, 1960
 Pammene trauniana (Denis & Schiffermüller, 1775)
 Pammene tricuneana (Kennel, 1900)
 Pammene tsugae Issiki in Issiki & Mutuura, 1961

Synonyms
Obsolete scientific names (junior synonyms and others) of Pammene are:

 Encelis (lapsus)
 Eucelis Hübner, [1825]
 Encells (lapsus)
 Halonota Stephens, 1852
 Hemene (lapsus)
 Hemerosia Stephens, 1852
 Hemimene Hübner, 1825
 Heusimene Stephens, 1834
 Metasphaeroeca Fernald, 1908

 Orchemia Guenée, 1845
 Palla Billberg, 1820 (non Hübner, 1819: preoccupied)
 Pamene (lapsus)
 Pammena (lapsus)
 Phthoroblastis Lederer, 1859
 Psudotomia Stephens, 1829
 Pyrodes Guenée, 1845 (non Audinet-Serville, 1832: preoccupied)
 Sphaeroeca Meyrick, 1895 (non Lauterborn, 1894: preoccupied)
 Trycheris Guenée, 1845

The synonymy of Pammene has been subject to some confusion with its close relatives Cydia and Epinotia: Eucelis, Orchemia and Trycheris are sometimes listed as junior synonyms of the former, and Halonota has been listed as synonym of the latter. But the type species of Eucelis and Trycheris is Tortrix mediana (a junior synonym of P. aurana), that of Orchemia is O. gallicana (a junior synonym of P. gallicana), and that of Halonota is Pyralis populana (a junior synonym of P. populana). Thus, Eucelis, Halonota, Orchemia and Trycheris are all junior subjective synonym of the present genus.

Footnotes

References

  (20091): Online World Catalogue of the Tortricidae – Genus Pammene account. Version 1.3.1. Retrieved 2009-APR-20.
  (2009b): Online World Catalogue of the Tortricidae – Pammene species list. Version 1.3.1. Retrieved 2009-JAN-20.
  (2005): Markku Savela's Lepidoptera and some other life forms – Pammene. Version of 2005-SEP-13. Retrieved 2010-APR-20.
  (2009): Markku Savela's Lepidoptera and some other life forms – Epinotia. Version of 2009-JUL-07. Retrieved 2010-APR-19.

Grapholitini
Tortricidae genera
Taxa named by Jacob Hübner